Leucine rich repeat containing 57, also known as LRRC57 is a protein encoded in humans by the LRRC57 gene.

Function
The exact function of LRRC57 is not known.  It is a member of the leucine-rich repeat family of proteins, which are known to be involved in protein-protein interactions.

Protein sequence
As is customary for leucine-rich repeat proteins, the sequence is shown below with the repeats starting on their own lines.  The beginning of each repeat is a β-strand, which forms a β-sheet along the concave side of the protein.  The convex side of the protein is formed by the latter half of each repeat, and may consist of a variety of structures, including α-helices, 310 helices, β-turns, and even short β-strands.

Note that the 5' and 3' UTR both are rich in leucines, suggesting that they may be degenerate repeats (the overall protein is 19.7% leucine and 7.5% asparagine, both very rich).

The following layout of the LRRC57 amino acid sequence makes it easy to discern the LxxLxLxxNxxL consensus sequence of LRRs.

Homology 

LRRC57 is exceedingly well conserved, as shown by the following multiple sequence alignment, prepared using ClustalX2.  The cyan and yellow highlights call out regions of high conservation and the repeats.

The following table provides a few details on orthologs of the human version of LRRC57.  To save space, not all of these orthologs are included in the above multiple sequence alignment.  These orthologs were gathered from BLAT. and BLAST searches

Gene neighborhood 

The LRRC57 gene has interesting relationships to its neighbors – HAUS2 upstream and SNAP23 downstream, as shown below for human.

Shown below is the neighborhood for the mouse ortholog.  Note that the neighbors are the same, which is true for most vertebrates.

Note the close proximity between LRRC57 and HAUS2/CEP27 (the same gene by different names).  In humans, the exons are 50bp apart, whereas in mouse, they overlap, as shown in the closeup, below.  This close relationship may partially explain the high conservation of LRRC57, as it would require a mutation to be stable in both genes at the same time.

The relationship to the downstream neighbor, SNAP23 is also interesting.  Quoting from the AceView entry: "373 bp of this gene are antisense to spliced gene SNAP23, raising the possibility of regulated alternate expression".  Taking the reverse complement of the LRRC57 cDNA and aligning it with the SNAP23 cDNA does show high similarity, as shown in this partial alignment:

Predicted post-translational modifications 

The tools on the ExPASy Proteomics site predict the following post-translational modifications:

The predicted modifications for Homo sapiens are shown on the following conceptual translation.  The cyan highlights are predicted phosphorylation sites and the yellow highlights are as labeled.  The red boxes show predictions that are conserved across all four organisms.

The sites for all four organisms are highlighted on the following multiple sequence alignment.

Note that the phosphorylation at S201 and the sulfation at Y224 are the only well conserved predictions across all four organisms.

Structure

The structure of LRRC57 is not known.  However, a protein BLAST search against the protein databank returns a similar protein, with an E-value of 3E−14.  It is also a leucine rich repeat containing seven repeats of the same length as LRRC57, described as Eptatretus burgeri (inshore hagfish) variable lymphocyte receptors A29.

References

LRR proteins